Prauserella shujinwangii is a Gram-positive, spore-forming and rod-shaped bacterium from the genus Prauserella which has been isolated in Xinjiang, China.

References

Pseudonocardiales
Bacteria described in 2014